Marjorie Vinson  (21 May 1905 – 30 November 2000) was a British-born teacher. After moving to the  Falkland Islands she became the first woman to be elected to the islands' Legislative Council in 1964.

Biography
Vinson was born in Liverpool in May 1905, the oldest of five children of Florence (née Greaves) and Ernest Downs, a ship captain. With her father often at sea, she raised her younger siblings during her teenage years. After training as a primary school teacher, she worked at several schools in Liverpool.

Following World War II Vinson moved to Stanley in the Falkland Islands to start a three year contract as deputy head of the town's primary school. While in the Falklands, she met Dick Vinson. The couple married and she moved to North Arm, where they had two children and Vinson often taught children in the area when the visiting teacher was absent. The family moved to Darwin in 1964. In the same year she contested the elections to the Legislative Council. Winning the East Falkland by three votes, she became the first woman elected to the Legislative Council. During her term in the council she focused on education in Camp.

After leaving the Legislative Council, Vinson was awarded an MBE in the 1969 New Year Honours. When Dick retired in 1971, the couple moved to Datchet in England. She died in November 2000.

References

1905 births
People from Liverpool
Schoolteachers from Merseyside
English emigrants to the Falkland Islands
Falkland Islands schoolteachers
Members of the Legislative Council of the Falkland Islands
Falkland Islands women in politics
Members of the Order of the British Empire
2000 deaths